Richard M. Romero (born July 21, 1944) is an American educator and politician who served as a member of the New Mexico Senate from 1992 to 2004.

Early life and education 
Born in Oakland, California, Romero received in bachelor's degree from the University of Albuquerque and his master's degree from New Mexico State University.

Career 
After serving in the United States Air Force, Romero was a high school principal and financial planner in Albuquerque, New Mexico. From 1985 to 1987, Romero was superintendent of Albuquerque Public Schools. From 1992 to 2004, Romero served in the New Mexico State Senate as a Democrat. Romero served as president pro tempore of the New Mexico Senate in 2001.

Notes

1944 births
Living people
Politicians from Albuquerque, New Mexico
New Mexico State University alumni
University of Albuquerque alumni
Educators from New Mexico
Democratic Party New Mexico state senators
People from Oakland, California